Alberta Provincial Highway No. 814, commonly referred to as Highway 814, is a highway in the province of Alberta, Canada. It runs south–north from Highway 13 in Wetaskiwin to Beaumont town limits at Highway 625. This highway used to extend to Edmonton limits, until the Beaumont government took control of the road. This extension is the most direct link between Edmonton and the suburb of Beaumont. This route is also known as 47 Street in Wetaskiwin, and 50 Street in Beaumont and Edmonton.

Major intersections 
Starting from the south end of Highway 814:

See also 

 Transportation in Edmonton

References 

814